William Henry Lewis (3 December 1807 – 10 October 1889) was a Welsh cricketer with amateur status. He was educated at Harrow, where he played cricket for the school in 1825 and 1826. He then went up to Trinity College, Oxford, and played first-class cricket for Oxford University in 1827.

After Oxford, Lewis studied law at the Middle Temple. Later he lived in a house called Clynfiew (Clynfyw) in Abercych, near the tripoint of Pembrokeshire, Carmarthenshire and Cardiganshire. He was a magistrate and Deputy Lieutenant for Pembrokeshire, and High Sheriff of Pembrokeshire in 1847.

References

1807 births
1889 deaths
Welsh cricketers
English cricketers of 1826 to 1863
Oxford University cricketers
People educated at Harrow School
Alumni of Trinity College, Oxford
Deputy Lieutenants of Pembrokeshire
High Sheriffs of Pembrokeshire